Gil Island, also Glinyanii Island (Russian: остров Глиняный Ostrov Glinyanyy) is an island of Azerbaijan in the Caspian Sea.

Geography
This island is part of the Baku Archipelago, which consists of the following islands: Boyuk Zira, Dash Zira, Qum Island, Zenbil, Sangi-Mugan or Svinoy, Chikil, Qara Su, Khara Zira, Gil, Ignat Dash and a few smaller ones.

It lies south of the bay, detached from the group, close to the town of Alat, about 2 km from the nearest shore. Gil Island is about 1 km in length and 0.8 km wide. Gil Island has a long spit extending roughly westward.

References

Islands of Azerbaijan
Islands of the Caspian Sea
Mud volcanoes of Azerbaijan
Uninhabited islands of Azerbaijan